Perfect Remedy is the nineteenth studio album by English rock band Status Quo. In terms of British chart success, it marked a new low for the band, reaching a high of only No. 49 during a two-week run. The two singles from it, 'Not at All' and 'Little Dreamer', peaked at No. 50 and No. 76 respectively. In the memoir, 'XS All Areas: Francis Rossi and Rick Parfitt' (Sidgwick & Jackson, 2004, p. 290), Rossi said that it sold well in Europe and Australia, but they were back to square one in Britain. 'I don't know why it did so poorly. You could argue that the scene had moved on.'

Track listing
"Little Dreamer" (Francis Rossi, Bernie Frost) 4:04
"Not at All" (Francis Rossi, Bernie Frost) 2:54
"Heart On Hold" (Andy Bown, Phil Palmer) 3:36
"Perfect Remedy" (Francis Rossi, Bernie Frost) 4:36
"Address Book" (Francis Rossi, Bernie Frost) 3:37
"The Power of Rock" (Rick Parfitt, Pip Williams, Francis Rossi) 6:04
"The Way I Am" (John Edwards, Jeff Rich, Mike Paxman) 3:35
"Tommy's in Love" (Francis Rossi, Bernie Frost) 3:01
"Man Overboard" (Rick Parfitt, Pip Williams) 4:29
"Going Down for the First Time" (Andy Bown, John Edwards) 4:00
"Throw Her a Line" (Francis Rossi, Bernie Frost) 3:34
"1000 Years" (Francis Rossi, Bernie Frost) 3:31

2006 reissue bonus tracks

"Gone Thru The Slips" (Andy Bown) 3:42
"Rotten to the Bone" (Francis Rossi, Andy Bown) 3:40
"Doing It All for You" (Rick Parfitt, Pip Williams) 4:12
"Dirty Water" (Live) (Francis Rossi, Robert Young)
"The Power of Rock" (edited version) (Rick Parfitt, Pip Williams, Francis Rossi)
"The Anniversary Waltz Part One Medley"
 a) "Let's Dance" (Jim Lee) 
 b) "Red River Rock" (Tom King, Ira Mack, Fred Mendelsohn) 
 c) "No Particular Place to Go" (Chuck Berry) 
 d) "The Wanderer" (Ernesto Maresca) 
 e) "I Hear You Knocking" (Dave Bartholomew, Pearl King) 
 f) "Lucille" (Al Collins, Richard Penniman) 
 g) "Great Balls of Fire" (Jack Hammer, Otis Blackwell)

Personnel
Status Quo
Francis Rossi - vocals, lead guitar
Rick Parfitt - vocals, guitar
John Edwards - bass
Andy Bown - keyboards
Jeff Rich - drums
Recorded at Compass Point Studios, Nassau, Bahamas in summer 1989.

Chart positions

Certifications

References

1989 albums
Status Quo (band) albums
Vertigo Records albums